Brian D. Miller is an American politician and mechanical engineer, currently representing the 101st District in the New York State Assembly. The district includes portions of Delaware, Herkimer, Oneida, Orange, Otsego, Sullivan, and Ulster counties.

Early life and education
Miller is native of Utica, New York. A graduate of Mohawk Valley Community College, Miller has worked as a mechanical engineer for over 30 years.

Career 
In 1999, Miller was elected to the Oneida County Legislature, and later served as its chairman of the Public Works Committee, assistant majority leader, and as a member of the Ways and Means Committee. He also was Bridgewater Town Supervisor for eight years.

New York State Assembly 
After Assemblywoman Claudia Tenney was elected to United States House of Representatives in 2016, Miller opted to fill her vacant seat in the New York State Assembly. He defeated Maria Kelso in the Republican primary, winning the nomination by a 54 to 46 percent margin.

In the general election, Miller defeated Democrat Arlene Feldmeier and Kelso again, with over 54 percent of the vote in the three-way race. He was sworn into office in 2017 to succeed Tenney.

Personal life 
Miller resides in New Hartford, New York with his wife and son. In March 2020, he was hospitalized with COVID-19, the fourth Assemblymember to be diagnosed.

References

External links
New York State Assemblyman Brian D. Miller official site

Year of birth missing (living people)
Living people
County legislators in New York (state)
Town supervisors in New York (state)
Republican Party members of the New York State Assembly
21st-century American politicians
People from Oneida County, New York
American mechanical engineers